Charles Henry Chapman (1876 – 2 March 1957) was a New Zealand unionist and politician of the Labour Party and various predecessor parties.

Early life
Chapman was born in London, England, in 1876. At the age of 17 he joined the Independent Labour Party (ILP) and was later secretary of the London ILP Federation. Chapman was a linotype operator by trade as well as a union secretary. Upon leaving England he was made a life member of the ILP. He emigrated to New Zealand in 1905.

He settled in Wellington and became secretary of both the Wellington Typographical Union and Wellington Journalists Union. Chapman was also secretary of the Wellington Female Printers Assistants Union and the Wellington Related Printing Trades Union and was a proponent of related unions merging together for unity.

During World War I he was an advocator for dependents of servicemen and their rehabilitation. He became a member of the National Reparation Board. He was keenly interested in the work of the Red Cross Movement and was President of the New Zealand Red Cross for 25 years. He was also a worker for the Wellington Free Ambulance as a representative of the Red Cross. He was also a member of the Wellington Technical Board of Governors.

He was defeated in early 1928 for his position as secretary of the Wellington Typographical Union by James Henrichs. However he remained secretary of the Wellington Female Printers Assistants Union and the Wellington Related Printing Trades Union, but over time he became less enthusiastic about merging unions. In 1937 he was part of the printing unions' successful negotiating team for a legislated 40-hour work week.

Political career
He was on the executive of the Independent Political Labour League (IPLL) in 1906/07. He was on the Advisory Committee of the Social Democratic Party in 1915–1916.

Local body politics
He was a Wellington City Councillor from 1919–1925 and 1929–1941, and also served on the Wellington Hospital Board. Chapman served three separate terms on the Wellington Harbour Board from 1919–21, 1925–31 and 1933–41.

In 1915, Chapman ran for Mayor of Wellington as the Social Democratic candidate. In a three horse race, he came a distant third. He ran for mayor a further three times as the Labour Party's nominee. He ran in 1925, 1927 and 1938 placing second on each occasion. At the 1944 election he was nominated to be Labour's candidate for the mayoralty, one of five candidates he was not selected with Labour Party president James Roberts prevailing.

Member of Parliament

In , he stood in the Hawke's Bay electorate again and came a distant third (and last) after Gilbert McKay and Andrew Hamilton Russell.

In 1928, Chapman was elected as the Member of Parliament for Wellington North which he held until the seats abolition in 1946.

In 1945 he was appointed a member of the Wellington Rehabilitation Committee.

Later life
In 1935, he was awarded the King George V Silver Jubilee Medal, and in 1953 he received the Queen Elizabeth II Coronation Medal.

Chapman died in Wellington in 1957, aged 80, survived by a step-son and step-daughter. He was buried at Karori Cemetery in Wellington.

Notes

References

|-

1876 births
1957 deaths
New Zealand Labour Party MPs
New Zealand MPs for Wellington electorates
Members of the New Zealand House of Representatives
Wellington City Councillors
Social Democratic Party (New Zealand) politicians
Independent Political Labour League politicians
Unsuccessful candidates in the 1908 New Zealand general election
Unsuccessful candidates in the 1919 New Zealand general election
Unsuccessful candidates in the 1922 New Zealand general election
Unsuccessful candidates in the 1925 New Zealand general election
Burials at Karori Cemetery
Wellington Harbour Board members
Wellington Hospital Board members